The Women's team event at the 2015 European Games in Baku was held from 12 to 15 June, at the Baku Aquatics Centre.

Austria couldn't compete in the free routine after three of its swimmers, Vanessa Sahinovic, Luna Pajer and Verena Breit, were injured after being hit by a bus.

Schedule
All times are local (UTC+5).

Results
FR — Free Reserve

Preliminary

Final

References

External links

Team